The University of Jordan, often abbreviated UJ, is a public university located in Amman, Jordan. It was founded in 1962 by royal decree, and it is the largest and oldest institution of higher education in Jordan. It is located in the capital Amman in the Jubaiha area of the University District. It is composed of 20 faculties, and it contains over 95 departments.The main strategy and rule for the university is to be global and  productive in all the educational fields of it. 

The University District where the University of Jordan is located in is considered one of the most developed parts of Amman, with a rich history of education , culture, and a high population density. The University of Jordan is often nicknamed The Mother University, the nickname stems from the fact that it's the first university in Jordan and it has graduated many public and political figures who took on important roles in the government and media and helped establish other universities in Jordan and neighboring countries.

History
Before the founding of the University of Jordan, the people of Jordan had demanded constantly that a university is to be built in Jordan. Back then, in the 1950s, most Jordanian students studied higher education abroad. In 1962, ِa delegation from the British Army met with the commanders of the Jordanian Army to negotiate terms for aid from the British government intended to help with the establishment of the University of Jordan. Before King Hussein bin Talal gave the royal decree, he had been negotiating with Prime Minister Wasfi Tal regarding the establishment of the university, and they both agreed on moving forward with it; and thus King Hussein bin Talal put Prime Minister Wasfi Tal in charge of establishing the University of Jordan.

Academics
The University of Jordan offers undergraduate and postgraduate programs. The university has 78 undergraduate programs and 143 postgraduate programs which are  divided into 109 master's degrees, and 34 doctoral degrees. The faculties are categorized into three streams: Scientific faculties, Humanitarian faculties, and Medical (Health) faculties.

Faculties 
The University of Jordan's faculties include:

Scientific faculties 
There are four scientific faculties:
School of Science
School of Agriculture
School of Engineering
King Abdullah II School for Information TechnologyThese faculties include 22 departments such as the department of Physics in the school of science, and the department of Electrical Engineering in the school of engineering. The faculty of Engineering was established in 1975, and is now the biggest faculty in the University of Jordan, as of 2021 all its departments have been accredited by ABET; Chemical Engineering,  Civil Engineering, Computer Engineering, Electrical Engineering, Industrial Engineering, Mechanical engineering and Mechatronics Engineering.

Humanitarian faculties 

School of Arts
School of Business
School of Sharia
School of Educational Sciences
School of Law
School of Physical Education
School of Arts and Design
School of International Studies
School of Foreign languages
School of Archaeology and Tourism

Medical faculties 
See Also: Medical education in Jordan
School of Nursing
School of Medicine
School of Pharmacy
School of Dentistry
School of Rehabilitation Sciences

Centers and institutes
Institutes:
 Institute of Archaeology
 International Institute for Teaching Arabic Language to Speakers of Other Languages
 Social Work Institute
 Institute of agricultural research training extension and education
 The Institute for the Study of Islam in the Contemporary World] </ref>
Centers:
 Center for Photonics Research
 The University of Jordan Language Center
Directed at offering courses of Arabic language as a foreign language.
 The Jordan Academy of Arabic
One of 10 academies in the world that regulate Arabic language and literature. The academy is considered one of the world's top references for Arabic language and Arabic literature. The main publication of the academy is the biannual journal "The Journal of Jordan Academy of Arabic", as well as many dictionaries and other publications.
 The Islamic Cultural Center
Established in 1982, it provides support for researchers on Islamic studies, it also organizes courses and seminars for Islamic history and literature scholars.
 The Center for Documents and Manuscripts
Established in 1972 to promote the study of Arabic and Islamic heritage, and to provide researchers with original and primary sources. The CDM library boasts 31,000 manuscripts.
 Water and Environment Research and Study Center
The objective of the establishment of the center is to provide research in water management and environment on the regional and international level.
 Deanship of Research and Graduate Studies
The University of Jordan launched its first graduate program in 1968/69, it was an MA program in Educational Administration and Guidance,
the faculty cooperates with:

 Jordan Media Institute which offers a one–year practical master's degree.
 The National Center for Diabetes, Endocrinology and Genetics, which offers MA and High Diploma.
 Center for Strategic Studies Jordan
The center was established in 1998 aiming to perform political and economical studies on the national and regional level. The center also performs polls with high levels of accuracy. The center occasionally performs studies for Aljazeera.

Jordan University Hospital 

The Jordan University Hospital was established in 1973, and it was merged with the University of Jordan in 1976.It is one of the most developed hospitals in Jordan. Its been accredited by many organizations, most notably JCI and HACCP. It also has affiliations with King Hussein Cancer Center, which was the first Cancer Center outside of the United States to be accredited by the JCI Disease Specific Certification (DSC) in November 2007.

Scientific research

Scientific collections

The university research facilities contain collections of historic documents and manuscripts as well as fossil remains that are considered to be of valuable importance for the scientific community, "to provide primary and secondary sources for researchers", among which are the world's only discovered fossil bones of Arambourgiania.

Jordan University Press

According to Nature journal, Jordan has the highest number of researchers per million people in the Arab World, and the 30th worldwide. In its objective to promote scientific research, the Jordanian Ministry of Higher Education and Scientific Research established collaboration with the University of Jordan Deanship of Academic Research in the early 1990s to publish several internationally peer-reviewed scientific journals on the highest standards in applied and social sciences as well as medical and pharmaceutical sciences. These journals are:
 Jordan Medical Journal a peer refereed journal for researches in medical sciences and molecular biology.
 Jordan Journal of Pharmaceutical Sciences
 Jordan Journal of Business Administration
 Jordan Journal of Social Sciences
 Jordan Journal for History and Archaeology
 Jordan Journal of Agricultural Sciences

The University of Jordan Press issues the internationally peer-reviewed Dirasat Journal series, and several other journals in Arabic literature, Arabic and Middle Eastern history, and regional culture:
 Aqlam Jadidah, a journal mainly for Arabic literature
 The Cultural Journal, a quarterly published journal in Arabic, founded in 1983.
 Dirasat Journal Series:
 Agricultural Sciences
 Human and Social Sciences
 Administrative Sciences
 Educational Sciences
 Engineering Sciences
 Shari'a and Law Sciences
 Pure Sciences

Rankings 

The University of Jordan has the highest admission scores for most majors in the country. According to the 2021 Webometrics Ranking of World Universities, it is the top ranked university in Jordan and the number 11 university in the Arab world.

In 2022, QS has ranked the university in the 591 - 600 band in the world with 5 stars rating, 101 - 450 by subject rankings, tenth in the Arab world and 301 – 500 in graduate employability globally. In the same year, Times Higher Education ranked the university within the 801 - 1000 band globally, 179th for BRICS and Emerging Economies, 250 – 300 in Asian university rankings, and 22nd for Arab University Rankings 2021.

In 2022, the University of Jordan ranked in the 701 - 800 band in Shanghai Academic Ranking of World Universities, and in 151 - 500 band for various subject rankings.

International affiliations and agreements

Bilateral agreements
The University of Jordan has hundreds of agreements mostly for student exchange programs, of which 16 agreements are with universities in the United States such as Vanderbilt University and Murray State University.

Affiliations
 International Association of Universities
 Federation of the Universities of the Islamic World
 Mediterranean Universities Union
 Association of Arab Universities

Students
The University of Jordan Student Union is the University's student body. A student council, formally called "Student Union" of 80 members is elected annually. It acts as a liaison between the students and the university administration on matters of major concern to students. It also publishes the student monthly Sawt al-Talaba (The Students' Voice).

The regulations governing the Student Union have been subject to several revisions and major changes since its conception. The latest version of these regulations was written by a committee of both students (Hamdoon Khateeb, Malek Khalaileh, Khaled Gabba, Yasmeen AbuTaleb, Issam Khoury) and faculty members (Dr. Ali Mahafzah, Dr. Ali Badran, Dr. Ali Sawwa) and put into effect in 2008.

Alumni

Graduates from UJ have attained positions in many fields in many countries including government, science, business, literature, and military. Some notable alumni are:
 Rami Hamdallah, former prime Minister of Palestine
 Maha Ali, current Minister of Industry, Trade and Supply of Jordan
Afroz Ahmad,Indian civil servant
 Jeffrey Feltman, United States Assistant Secretary of State for Near Eastern Affairs.
 Wadah Khanfar, former director general of the Al Jazeera Media Network.
 Hoshyar Zebari, minister of foreign affairs of Iraq.
 Malik R. Dahlan, Professor of International Law and Public Policy Queen Mary University of London, International Chair, Harvard Law School Association, President Institution Quraysh for Law & Policy 
 Eid Dahiyat, former minister of education of the Hashemite Kingdom of Jordan.
 Zu'bi M.F. Al-Zu'bi, Director of Development at The University of Sydney, Australia and Fellow of the Higher Education Academy United Kingdom.
 Ehab Al Shihabi, executive director of international operations for Al Jazeera Media Network.
 Saleh Ali Al-Kharabsheh, Jordanian Minister of Energy and Mineral Resources
 Yousef Al-Abed, chemist, professor at Feinstein Institute for Medical Research
 Alaa Wardi, Saudi Arabian musician and artist
 Ahmad Ziadat, Jordanian Minister of Justice
 Zulaikha Abu Risha, writer and activist

See also
 List of universities in Jordan

References

External links

 Jordan Ministry of Education
 Jordan Ministry of Higher Education and Scientific Research
 American University of Madaba (AUM)
 University of Jordan Guys Forum
 University of Jordan Official website
 Faculty of Agriculture
 Faculty of Foreign Languages
 Faculty of Arts
 Center for Strategic Studies Jordan
 The University of Jordan Programs Library

 
1962 establishments in Jordan
Educational institutions established in 1962
Universities in Jordan
University of Jordan